This is an article about qualification for the 2016 Men's U20 Volleyball European Championship.

Qualification summary

Pool standing procedure
 Number of matches won
 Match points
 Sets ratio
 Points ratio
 Result of the last match between the tied teams

Match won 3–0 or 3–1: 3 match points for the winner, 0 match points for the loser
Match won 3–2: 2 match points for the winner, 1 match point for the loser

Direct qualification

Host country, qualified for final round directly.

First round
First round was held 7–9 January 2016. 6 teams competed in 2 first round tournaments consisting of 3 teams. The winners of each pools qualified for the second round.
Pools composition

All times are local.

Pool 1
Venue:  BBC Arena, Schaffhausen, Switzerland

|}

|}

Pool 2
Venue:  Hala Widowiskowo Sportowa, Chęciny, Poland

|}

|}

Second round
Second round was held 31 March – 3 April 2016. 28 teams competed in 7 pools of 4 teams. The winners of each pools qualified for final round. The 2nd placed teams of each pool and the best 3rd placed team qualified for the third round.
Pools composition

All times are local.

Pool A
Venue:  Dvorana Gimnasium, Rovinj, Croatia

|}

|}

Pool B
Venue:  PalaVesuvio, Naples, Italy

|}

|}

Pool C
Venue:  Ali Yucel Sports Hall, Tokat, Turkey

|}

|}

Pool D
Venue:  Carl-von-Weinberg Halle, Frankfurt, Germany

|}

|}

Pool E
Venue:  Landessportzentrum Viva, Steinbrunn, Austria

|}

|}

Pool F
Venue:  Sportna Dvorana, Nova Gorica, Slovenia

|}

|}

Pool G
Venue:  Sportska Hala Vlade Divac, Vrnjačka Banja, Serbia

|}

|}

Ranking of the third placed teams

|}

Third round
Third round will be held 8–10 July 2016. 8 teams will compete in 2 pools of 4 teams. The winners and runners-up of each pools will qualify for the final round.

Pools composition

All times are local.

Pool H
Venue:  Polideportivo Pilar Fernandez, Valladolid, Spain

|}

|}

Pool I
Venue:  Minsk Sports Palace, Minsk, Belarus

|}

|}

References

External links
Official website

Men's Junior European Volleyball Championship
European Championship U20